Korea is an unincorporated community in Menifee County, Kentucky, United States. It lies along Route 1693 east of the city of Frenchburg, the county seat of Menifee County.  Its elevation is 1,119 feet (341 m). Their post office closed in February 1982 

Korea is part of the Mount Sterling Micropolitan Statistical Area.

References

Unincorporated communities in Menifee County, Kentucky
Unincorporated communities in Kentucky
Mount Sterling, Kentucky micropolitan area